John Rae (1845 – 1915) was a Scottish journalist and biographer. The long-time editor of The Contemporary Review, and contributor to The British Quarterly Review, he became famous for his 1895 biography of Adam Smith, Life of Adam Smith, which replaced the Biographical Memoir of Adam Smith of 1811, by Dugald Stewart, as the standard Smith reference.

Bibliography
Contemporary Socialism (1884; and new editions 1891, 1901, 1908)
 'The Eight Hours Day in Victoria' (1891), in: The Economic Journal (EJ), Vol. 1, pp. 15–42 (in  Wikisource)
Eight Hours for Work (1894)
Life of Adam Smith (1895)

Notes

References 

 Rae: a journalist out of his depth, by Aaron B. Fuller, The American Journal of Economics and Sociology, November 2003

External links
 
 

1845 births
1915 deaths
Scottish biographers
Scottish magazine editors
Scottish journalists
Place of birth missing
Scottish political journalists
19th-century Scottish people